Bruce Rutherford Thompson (July 31, 1911 – February 10, 1992) was a United States district judge of the United States District Court for the District of Nevada.

Education and career

Born in Reno, Nevada, Thompson received an Artium Baccalaureus degree from the University of Nevada, Reno in 1932 and a Bachelor of Laws from Stanford Law School in 1936. He was in private practice in Reno from 1936 to 1963, serving as an Assistant United States Attorney of the District of Nevada from 1942 to 1952, and as a Special Master for the United States District Court for the District of Nevada from 1952 to 1954.

Federal judicial service

On July 9, 1963, Thompson was nominated by President John F. Kennedy to a seat on the United States District Court for the District of Nevada vacated by Judge John Rolly Ross. Thompson was confirmed by the United States Senate on August 6, 1963, and received his commission on August 16, 1963. He assumed senior status on August 31, 1978, serving in that capacity until his death on February 10, 1992.

Honor

The Bruce R. Thompson United States Courthouse in Reno was named for Thompson.

Personal

Thompson's brother, Gordon R. Thompson, was a Justice of the Supreme Court of Nevada from 1961 to 1980.

References

Sources
 

1911 births
1992 deaths
Judges of the United States District Court for the District of Nevada
United States district court judges appointed by John F. Kennedy
20th-century American judges
Stanford Law School alumni
University of Nevada, Reno alumni
Politicians from Reno, Nevada
20th-century American lawyers
Assistant United States Attorneys